The 2007 Bulgarian Figure Skating Championships were the National Championships of the 2006–07 figure skating season. Skaters competed in the disciplines of men's singles, ladies' singles, pair skating, and ice dancing on the senior level.

The results were used to choose the teams to the 2007 World Championships and the 2007 European Championships.

Results

Men

Ladies

Pairs

Ice dancing

External links
 results

Bulgarian Figure Skating Championships, 2007